Kélian Galletier (born 18 March 1992) is a French rugby union player who plays for Montpellier in the Top 14 club competition. He currently plays as blindside flanker or number-eight.

He was selected for the French national team for the 2016 Summer Internationals after his performances in the Top 14.

References

External links
France profile at FFR
Statistics on itsrugby.co.uk

Montpellier Hérault Rugby players
French rugby union players
Rugby union flankers
Rugby union number eights
1992 births
Living people
France international rugby union players